The Baiji oil refinery is the largest oil refinery in Iraq and produces a third of the country's oil output. The refinery is 130 miles north of Baghdad, about halfway between Baghdad and Mosul, near the city of Baiji. In 2008, 500 tanker trucks filled with fuel used to leave the refinery per day. It was a target of intense fighting between the Islamic State and the Iraqi government in 2014 and 2015.

Capture by ISIS

The refinery was captured for the first time on 24 June 2014 after 10 days of seizure. The refinery was taken back by Iraqi forces and Shia militias, known as popular mobilization forces, fighting alongside them on 16 October 2015, after it had changed hands repeatedly. It had received so much damage that it would take years to have it operational.

References

Oil refineries in Iraq